Dasysyrphus is a genus of hover flies with 50 identified species distributed worldwide (see distribution map).  While the genus is relatively easy to identify,  genera key  the differences between species have a more narrow range of variations. Therefore, identification of species by images of specimens alone should be made with care. (See available keys below)

Larvae
The known larvae are mostly tree dwelling on both conifers and deciduous trees. They feed on aphids and other small Hemiptera resting in the daytime. This nocturnal habit, plus the camouflage coloration of the larvae may account for the lack of larval reports for this genus.

Description
for taxonomic terms see Thompson or Speight
These are medium-sized flies with a combination of characters: the margin of the abdomen grooved and dark with light spots present on tergites 2,3 and 4, haired eyes microtrichose wings (at least anteror third) with a elongate stigma, third vein ending at the apex of the wing, calypter with ventral lobe bare and a bare metasternum.

Resources for identification to species
Bartsch et al. (2009) for Nordic countries,
Barkalov (2007) for Urals, Siberia and the Far East. 
van Veen (2004) for Northwestern Europe  
Van der Goot,V.S. (1981) Russia 
Stubbs & Falk (1983) for Britain 
Ghorpade (1994) for India   (Ghorpade, 1994) 
Peck(1974) for the Palaearctic
Locke 2013 Nearctic  key nearctic species key

Species
D. albostriatus (Fallén, 1817)
D. amalopis (Osten Sacken, 1875)
D. bilineatus (Matsumura, 1917)
D. corsicanus (Becker, 1921)
D. creper (Snow, 1895)
D. eggeri (Schiner, 1862)
D. friuliensis (van der Goot, 1960)
D. hilaris (Zetterstedt, 1843)
D. intrudens (Osten Sacken, 1877)
D.laticaudus Curran, 1925
D. lapidosus Barkalov, 1990
D. lenensis Bagatshanova, 1980
D. limatus (Hine, 1922)
D. lotus (Williston, 1887)
D.neovenustus Soszyński & Mielczarek, 2013
D. nigricornis (Verrall, 1873)
D.occidualis Locke & Skevington, 2013 
D. osburni (Curran, 1925)
D. pacificus (Lovett) 
D. pauxillus (Williston, 1887)
D. pinastri (De Geer, 1776)
D. postclaviger (Stys & Moucha, 1962)
D. reflectipennis (Curran, 1921)
D. richardi Locke & Skevington, 2013
D. tricinctus (Fallén, 1817)
D. venustus (Meigen, 1822)

References

Hoverfly genera
Taxa named by Günther Enderlein
Syrphini